Ramin Rezaeian Semeskandi (born 21 March 1990) is an Iranian professional footballer who plays as a defender for Persian Gulf Pro League club Sepahan and the Iran national team.

He started his career as a right-back, but he often plays as a winger. Rezaeian was Carlos Queiroz's first choice on the right side of the defense of the Iran men's national team in the 2018 FIFA World Cup qualification matches.

Early life
Rezaeian was born in Semes Kandeh-ye Olya, a village in Sari County, Mazanderan.

Club career

Saba Qom
Rezaeian played his entire career for Saba Qom before signing for Rah Ahan in 2013. He made 98 appearances for the club scoring seven goals.

Rah Ahan
Rezaeian signed a three–year with the Tehran-based club Rah Ahan in 2013. After several good performances in the 2014–15 season, Rezaeian was recognized as one of the best fullbacks in the league and was called up to the national team. On 3 April 2015, Rezaeian scored his team's first goal in a 2–2 draw against Persepolis. Two weeks later, on 17 April, he scored a brace in a 2–2 draw against Esteghlal Khuzestan.

Persepolis

Rezaeian joined Persepolis on 27 June 2015 with a two-year contract. He scored his first goal for Persepolis in a 2–0 victory against Siah Jamegan. On 26 December 2015, Rezaeian scored a 30-yard free kick against Padideh in stoppage time to earn them a 2–2 draw. He also scored the third goal for Persepolis in the Tehran derby against Esteghlal F.C. on 15 April 2016. Persepolis won that derby 4-2. After initially signing a contract with Turkish Süper Lig club Rizespor in the summer of 2016, Rezaeian cancelled his contract and re–joined Persepolis.

After an altercation with teammate Ali Alipour during a training camp before an AFC Champions League match, Rezaeian was told to train by himself. After a few weeks, his contract was eventually terminated with Persepolis and he was released.

Oostende
After rejecting an offer from Tehran rivals Esteghlal F.C., Rezaeian joined Belgian club K.V. Oostende on 9 July 2017 with a two-year contract after a successful trial period at the club. Ramin made his debut on 27 July 2017 in a 3rd round Europa League qualifier against French club Olympique de Marseille. Oostende lost the match 4–2 and Rezaeian played the full 90 minutes.

Al Shahania

On 6 November 2018, Rezaeian joined Qatar Stars League side Al Shahania. In his first match with the club, on 8 November, Ramin scored a free kick goal in his team's 5–1 loss to Al Duhail. On 23 November, in his second match with his club, Ramin assisted his team's only goal in a 1–0 win against Al-Kharitiyath.

Al-Duhail

On 22 August 2020, Rezaeian signed a two year contract with Qatar Stars League champion, Al-Duhail.

Al-Sailiya

After the engagement of the new trainer from Al-Duhail, Rezaein was loaned to Al-Sailiya.

Persepolis 
On 12 February 2022, Rezaeian signed a contract with Persian Gulf Pro League champions Persepolis.

Sepahan 
On 15 July 2022, Rezaeian signed a contract with Persian Gulf Pro League side Sepahan.

International career

He was called into Iran's 2015 AFC Asian Cup squad on 30 December 2014 by Carlos Queiroz. He made his debut against Iraq in a friendly on 4 January 2015. He also played a friendly match against Sweden. Rezaeian scored his first international goal on 17 November 2015 in a 6–0 victory against Guam. In May 2018, he was named in Iran's preliminary squad for the 2018 FIFA World Cup in Russia.

2021

Despite his good performances, he was not invited to the national team.

Style of play 
Rezaeian has a high-level skill in long and fast starts. He has a high skill in long passes and corner and free kicks. He also has good scoring skills.

BBC Persian wrote about him: "On the right side, Ramin Rezaeian is the key player of Branko. He is considered Branko's savior with his scoring power in difficult situations."

Personal life 

He is popular among Iranian football fans, especially Persepolis fans. His father is a retired doctor and he has only one older sister. Among football players, he is interested in Iranian legend, Ali Karimi. He has announced that he controls his diet and loves ice cream.

Career statistics

Club

International

Statistics accurate as of match play

International goals
Scores and results list Iran's goal tally first.

Honours

Club
Persepolis
Iran Pro League (1): 2016–17 ; Runner-up (1): 2015–16
Al-Sailiya
Qatari Stars Cup (1): 2020–21
QFA Cup (1): 2021

Individual
Iran Pro League Team of the Season: 2014–15, 2015–16

References

External links

1990 births
Living people
People from Sari, Iran
Sportspeople from Sari, Iran
Iranian footballers
Association football defenders
Association football wingers
Saba players
Rah Ahan players
Persepolis F.C. players
K.V. Oostende players
Al-Shahania SC players
Al-Duhail SC players
Al-Sailiya SC players
Sepahan S.C. footballers
Persian Gulf Pro League players
Belgian Pro League players
Qatar Stars League players
Iranian expatriate footballers
Expatriate footballers in Belgium
Expatriate footballers in Qatar
Iranian expatriate sportspeople in Belgium
Iranian expatriate sportspeople in Qatar
Iran international footballers
2015 AFC Asian Cup players
2018 FIFA World Cup players
2019 AFC Asian Cup players
2022 FIFA World Cup players